Culloden (known as The Battle of Culloden in the U.S.) is a 1964 docudrama written and directed by Peter Watkins for BBC TV. It portrays the 1746 Battle of Culloden, which resulted in the British Army's destruction of the Scottish Jacobite rising of 1745 and, in the words of the narrator, "tore apart forever the clan system of the Scottish Highlands." Described in its opening credits as "an account of one of the most mishandled and brutal battles ever fought in Britain," Culloden was hailed as a breakthrough for its presentation of a historical event in the style of modern TV war reporting, as well as its use of non-professional actors. The film was based on John Prebble's study of the battle.

Production
Culloden was Watkins's first full-length film. It was also his first use of his docudrama style in which actors portray historical characters being interviewed by filmmakers on the scene as though it were happening in front of news cameras. The film was produced on a low budget, with only a handful of extras and a single cannon. Watkins made use of carefully planned camera angles to give the appearance of an army.

Watkins also "wanted to break through the conventional use of professional actors in historical melodramas, with the comfortable avoidance of reality that these provide, and to use amateurs—ordinary people—in a reconstruction of their own history." He accordingly used an all-amateur cast from London and the Scottish Lowlands for the Hanoverian forces, and people from Inverness for the Jacobite army. This later became a central technique of Watkins's filmmaking.

According to an estimate by the cinematographer for the film, Dick Bush, about 85% of all camerawork in Culloden was hand-held. This cinéma vérité-style shooting gave an already gritty reality a sense of present action. Culloden looked like a documentary of an event that occurred long before the film camera was invented.

Reception
Culloden won in 1965 both a Society of Film and Television Arts (BAFTA) TV Award for Specialised Programmes and the British Screenwriters' Award of Merit. In a list of the 100 Greatest British Television Programmes drawn up by the British Film Institute in 2000, voted for by industry professionals, Culloden was placed 64th. Writing for Eye for Film, Amber Wilkinson praised Culloden, commenting that "the mastery of [Watkins's] direction is obvious from first to last".

Production crew
Production design – Anne Davey, Colin MacLeod, Brendon Woods
Makeup artist – Ann Brodie
Sound department – John Gatland, Lou Hanks
Production unit – Rodney Barnes, Valerie Booth, Roger Higham, Jennifer Howie, Michael Powell	
Historical advisor – John Prebble
Production unit – Geraldine Proudfoot, Geoff Sanders
Battle coordinator – Derek Ware

See also
Drama documentary
Insurrection (1966 TV series)
The Highlanders (1966 Doctor Who serial)
Chasing the Deer (1994 film)

References

Further reading
 John Prebble, Culloden (Secker & Warburg 1961 – Atheneum 1962).
 Peter Watkins' commentary on his first BBC documentary
 Notes on 'Culloden' from Peter Watkin's website
 Culloden, "Background and Context", British Film Institute
 Culloden entry in the BFI TV-100, 2000 list

External links 
 

1964 television films
1964 films
BBC television docudramas
Films directed by Peter Watkins
Jacobite rising of 1745 films
Scottish Gaelic-language films
Fiction set in 1746
1960s British films